The Doane College Historic Buildings are located on the Doane University campus at 1014 Boswell Avenue in Crete, Nebraska, United States. Listed on the National Register of Historic Places as a historic district, there are three buildings included: Gaylord Hall, Whitcomb Conservatory/Lee Memorial Chapel, and Boswell Observatory.

About
Gaylord Hall was built in 1884 as a women's dormitory. Boswell Observatory is a small structure built in 1883-84 to house Doane College's program in astronomy and meteorology. The Whitcomb Lee Conservatory was completed in 1907.

The Whitcomb Lee Conservatory, also known as The Con, is a two-story building designed by the Chicago architectural firm of Dean and Dean in 1905. It was completed in 1907, and originally housed Lee Memorial Chapel and the music department. It is a five-sided brick building that. In 2005 the building was renovated, and currently provides facilities for the University's theatre department. The conservatory was winner of the 2005 AIA Nebraska Design Award for its restoration.

Gaylord Hall was the third building constructed on the Doane College campus and was completed in 1884. Built in a late Victorian residential style, the hall was originally a residence hall for female students called Ladies Hall. It was renamed after Reverend Reuben Gaylord, a pioneer home missionary and Christian educator in Iowa and Nebraska.

References

External links
Additional photos at Wikimedia Commons
Boswell Observatory, Doane College, Crete, Saline, NE at the Historic American Buildings Survey (HABS)

Historic American Buildings Survey in Nebraska
School buildings on the National Register of Historic Places in Nebraska
Buildings and structures in Saline County, Nebraska
Doane University
Historic districts on the National Register of Historic Places in Nebraska
National Register of Historic Places in Saline County, Nebraska